Bairros Unidos Futebol Clube (also known as Caixão Grande) is a football club that plays in the São Tomé and Príncipe Championship.  The team is based in the island of São Tomé and the village of Caixão Grande.  The team has won five overall titles.  As, Caixão Grande, the club won their first and only cup title in 1995.  It is the eighth and last team ever to win their first island and national title in 1996 .  Under the present name Bairros Unidos, the club won their second and recent island title in 2001 and later the national title in 2001 after defeating Príncipe's GD Sundy (2–0 away, 4–2 at home).  Their title totals were fourth in the nation and shared it with Inter Bom-Bom and Guadalupe, in 2003, Inter Bombom's win made Bairros Unidos' rankings fifth, in 2012 it became shared with Sporting Clube do Príncipe and still stands today.  The club relegated to the second division in 2009 after being in the last two positions  The club again returned to the island Premier Division in recent years.

Logo
Its logo has a green shield with yellow edges inside a blue portion.  The club names are on each side.  The town's crest is inside the logo.

Honours
National:
 São Tomé and Príncipe Championships: 2
1996, 2001
 São Tomé and Príncipe Cup: 1
1995
São Tomé and Príncipe Super Cup: 1
1997

Regional:
 São Tomé Island League: 2
1996, 2001
 Taça Regional de São Tomé: 1
 1997

League and cup history

Island championships

Statistics
Best position: 1st (national)
Best position at cup competitions: 1st (national)
Appearances:
National: 2

References

External links
Club profile at The Final Ball

Football clubs in São Tomé and Príncipe
Mé-Zóchi District
São Tomé Island Premier Division